Gilberto François "Betico" Croes (25 January 1938 – 26 November 1986) was an Aruban political activist who was a proponent for Aruba's separation from the Netherlands Antilles. This eventually occurred in 1986, but following a car accident on 31 December 1985 (the night of status aparte), Croes lapsed into a coma and  
never became conscious to see his accomplishment. He is best remembered as "Libertador" (liberator) and as  father of the Aruban people.

Biography and career

Croes was born on 25 January 1938 in Santa Cruz. After finishing high school, he studied in the Netherlands at the Teachers' Training College in Hilversum, and received his headmasters certificate in 1959.

In 1967, Croes first participated in the island council of Aruba as a member of the Aruban People's Party (AVP), and was elected. He resigned in July 1970 after the AVP had decided not give a seat to the UNA. 

In February 1971, Croes founded the political party People's Electoral Movement (Movimiento Electoral di Pueblo), and was elected to the island council. In 1973, the MEP won 5 of the 8 seats for Aruba in the Estates of the Netherlands Antilles. In 1976 he was the person responsible for the Seal, Flag and National Anthem of the island of Aruba. It was co-written by renowned Padu Del Caribe (Padu Lampe), and Rufo Wever, who also composed the anthem.

Background
In 1954, the Netherlands Antilles became a constituent country of the Kingdom of the Netherlands and was given self government. Aruba is the second most populous island, however Curaçao is the largest and most populous island. Aruba had 8 seats in the Estates of the Netherlands Antilles, Curaçao had 12 seats, Bonaire had one seat, and Saba, Sint Eustatius and Sint Maarten shared a single seat. The Capital of the Netherlands Antilles was Willemstad, Curaçao.

Struggle for independence
In 1977, Croes organised a referendum regarding Aruba's independence. The Aruban Patriotic Party (PPA) announced a boycott of the referendum, and the Government of the Netherlands Antilles declared the referendum illegal, and announced, prior to the referendum, that it was not willing to accept the results. In the March 1977 referendum, 95% of the voters were in favour of independence.

In June 1977, Boy Rozendal of the Democratic Party of Curaçao won a clear victory in the elections in the Netherlands Antilles. No formateur was assigned to create a new cabinet instead Rozendal, who was an opponent of Aruban autonomy, installed his coalition without consulting the MEP. Croes announced demonstrations and a boycott of Curaçaoan products.

On 11 August 1977, a general strike shut down the island during which the riot police made multiple charges. On 18 August, the union leaders were arrested and the strike ended, however Prime Minister Joop den Uyl of the Netherlands started a dialogue, because the situation had spun out of control.

In February 1981, at the Round Table Conference, Croes formally set Aruba's Independence for 1991, however the Round Table Conference of 1983, resulted in a proposed new Charter for the Kingdom of the Netherlands in which Aruba would have a Status aparte making it a constituent country within the Kingdom in 1986, and possible independence in 1996. 

On 24 April 1983, Croes was shot in the stomach by police officer Libier. Libier was transferred to Bonaire in June, In November, the Public Prosecution Service decided not to charge him, because there was no proof that he had aimed at Croes.

In July 1985 the charter, as agreed in March 1983, in Aruba's Decolonization and Independence Agreement, was unanimously approved by the island council of Aruba, however the PPA boycotted the vote. The Status aparte would take effect on 1 January 1986.

In the 1980s Croes recommended that Aruba should target tourism in order to diversify the economy, since it depended mainly on the refinery. He was also responsible for major projects for the people of Aruba, like the housing company FCCA, and the transportation company Arubus,

1985 elections and death 
In November 1985, the MEP lost the election, and Henny Eman of the Aruban People's Party (AVP) would become the first Prime Minister of Aruba.

On 31 December 1985 Croes was in a traffic accident, and lapsed in a coma. Croes died on 26 November 1986 in a reactivation and nursing centre in Utrecht, Netherlands. His remains where flown to Aruba for burial. An estimated 40,000 people attended his funeral (Aruba had an estimated 65,000 inhabitants in 1985).

A famous quote from him is "Si mi cai na caminda, gara e bandera y sigui cu e lucha" (If I fall down along the way, grab the flag and continue the battle).

Personal life
Croes had four children: two sons—Glenbert Croes and Gilberto Junior Croes and two daughters—Glendeline Croes and Guisette Croes.

Both of Croes' sons served as Ministers and Glenbert is as of 2021 in office as Minister of Labor, Integration and Energy.

Legacy
  is celebrated on his birthday of 25 January as a national holiday.
The 18 Maart Plein in Oranjestad was renamed Plaza Betico Croes.
Caya G. F. Betico Croes is named after him and is the main shopping street of Oranjestad, the Aruban capital.

References

People's Electoral Movement (Aruba) politicians
20th century in Aruba
1938 births
1986 deaths
Road incident deaths in Aruba
People from Santa Cruz, Aruba
Members of the Estates of the Netherlands Antilles
Aruban educators
Aruban politicians